Asphalt Tango is a 1996 Romanian comedy film directed by Nae Caranfil.

Cast 
 Charlotte Rampling - Marion
 Mircea Diaconu - Andrei
 Florin Călinescu - Gigi
  - Le chauffeur

References

External links 

1996 comedy films
1996 films
Romanian comedy films